Events from the year 2001 in Russia.

Incumbents
 President: Vladimir Putin
 Prime Minister: Mikhail Kasyanov

Events

 February 18 - FBI agent Robert Hanssen is arrested and charged with spying for Russia for 15 years.  
 March 23 - The Russian space station Mir re-enters the atmosphere near Nadi, Fiji, and falls into the Pacific Ocean.
 April 14 - Gazprom corporation took over NTV television channel
 May 9 - 56th Victory Day
 May 15 - Closure of Varshavsky railway station, Saint Petersburg
 June - Unified State Exam introduced
 June 15 - Declaration of Shanghai Cooperation Organisation signed
 June 29 - Good Night, Little Ones! airs its very last episode on Channel One Russia due to economic problems with the station.
 July 3 - A Vladivostokavia Tupolev Tu-154 jetliner crashes on approach to landing at Irkutsk, Russia, killing 145.
 July 16 - The People's Republic of China and the Russian Federation sign the Treaty of Good-Neighborliness and Friendly Cooperation.
 August 27 - Russian Football Premier League is created. 
 October 4 - Siberia Airlines Flight 1812 crashes over the Black Sea en route from Tel Aviv, Israel to Novosibirsk, Russia; 78 are killed.
 October 17 - President Vladimir Putin ordered to close the Lourdes SIGINT station, Cuba and Cam Ranh Air Force Base in Vietnam
 December 1 - United Russia is created.

Notable births
 March 30 – Anastasia Potapova, tennis player
 June 21 - Alexandra Obolentseva, chess player
 October 28 - Ekaterina Starshova, actress
 November 4 - Maksim Mukhin, football player

Notable deaths

 January 11 - Princess Vera Konstantinovna of Russia (born 1906)
 March 17 - Boris Rauschenbach, physicist and rocket engineer (born 1915)
 May 7 - Boris Ryzhy, poet (born 1974)
 May 12 - Alexei Tupolev, aircraft designer (born 1925)
 May 13 - Sergey Afanasyev, engineer and politician (born 1918)
 May 15 - Georgy Shakhnazarov, politician (born 1924)
 May 19 - Alexei Petrovich Maresiev, World War II pilot (born 1916)
 May 30 - Nikolai Korndorf, composer (born 1947)
 June 5 - Vasily Kolotov, weightlifter (born 1944)
 July 1 - Nikolay Basov, physicist, Nobel Prize laureate (born 1922)
 July 17 - Timur Apakidze, aviator (born 1954)
 August 10 
 Vladimir Bougrine, painter (born 1938)
 Stanislav Rostotsky, film director (born 1922)
 August 22 - Tatyana Averina, speed skater (born 1950)
 September 10 - Alexey Suetin, International Grandmaster of chess (born 1926)
 October 4 - Ahron Soloveichik, Russian-born American Rabbi (born 1917)
 October 10 - Vasily Mishin, rocket engineer (born 1917)
 October 23 - Georgy Vitsin, actor (born 1918)
 November 28 - Gleb Lozino-Lozinskiy, scientist (born 1909)
 November 29 - Viktor Astafiyev, writer (born 1924)
 December 1 - Pavel Sadyrin, footballer (born 1942)
 December 12 - Alexander Khmelik, creator of Yeralash (born 1925)
 December 23 - Dimitri Obolensky, historian (born 1918)
 December 27 - Boris Rybakov, historian (born 1908)

See also
List of Russian films of 2001

References

External links

 
Russia
Years of the 21st century in Russia
2000s in Russia
Russia
Russia